Black Mariah (real name Mariah Dillard) is a supervillain appearing in American comic books published by Marvel Comics. The character is usually depicted as an enemy of Luke Cage. She was created by Billy Graham, George Tuska, and Steve Englehart, and first appeared in Luke Cage, Hero for Hire Vol. 1, #5 (January 1973).

Alfre Woodard portrayed Mariah Dillard in the series Luke Cage, set in the Marvel Cinematic Universe.

Publication history
Black Mariah first appeared in Luke Cage: Hero for Hire #5 (January 1973) and was created by George Tuska and Steve Englehart.

Fictional character biography
Mariah Dillard was the leader of a gang of New York criminals called the Rat Pack. Their primary source of criminal activity was using a stolen ambulance to pick up the bodies of the recently deceased, and then stealing whatever valuables they had on their person. During one of these thefts, a widow of one of the victims hired Power Man (who was at the scene of the murder) to find her husband's body. Power Man finds the hideout of Black Mariah. This led to a clash between Mariah and her men against Power Man. Power Man defeated Mariah and her cohorts and turned them over to the police.

After some time in prison, Black Mariah started a drug-dealing enterprise. She is the primary distributor of a drug called Acid Z, a potent drug that would eventually make its users become crazy and often suicidal. When some of the drug got into the hands of Luke Cage's friend D.W. Griffith, Power Man went looking for his old friend while his partner Iron Fist tracked down the primary distributor and shut them down. Iron Fist found Black Mariah's hideout; however, he also found out that she had hired a special enforcer as protection: Iron Fist's old foe Scimitar. Power Man joined Iron Fist in battle after learning of his old foe's involvement in the drug distribution. The Heroes for Hire made short work of Mariah and Scimitar, crushing their drug operation and turning both crooks over to the police.

Black Mariah is featured in the 2016 relaunch of Power Man and Iron Fist. Here, she teams up with former Heroes for Hire secretary Jennifer "White Jennie" Royce into taking down Tombstone's empire.

Black Mariah later appears as a member of Alex Wilder's incarnation of the Pride.

Black Mariah is among the crime lords that compete with Mister Negative in obtaining the Tablet of Life and Destiny so that she can win the favor of Mayor Wilson Fisk.

Powers and abilities
While Black Mariah has no powers, her weight, estimated to be 400 lbs., enables her to strike with great force. Outside of her fighting experience, she has been known to catch her enemies off-guard.

In other media

Mariah Dillard (née Stokes) appears in Luke Cage, portrayed by Alfre Woodard as an adult and Megan Miller as a teenager. This version is a New York City councilwoman, the granddaughter of Harlem crime lord Maybelline "Mama Mabel" Stokes, cousin of gunrunner Cornell "Cottonmouth" Stokes, who funds her political campaigns, and estranged mother of Tilda Johnson who was raped by her uncle "Pistol Pete" Stokes at a young age. Throughout the first season, Mariah attempts to avoid getting involved in Cottonmouth's affairs. While his obsession with Luke Cage ruins her political campaign, Diamondback sends Shades to assist Mariah and Cottonmouth. Mariah later beats Cottonmouth to death with a microphone stand for suggesting she seduced Pete and frames Cage for it with Shades' help. Following Diamondback and Cage's arrests, Mariah takes over Harlem's criminal underworld, establishes a base for herself at the Harlem's Paradise night club, and enters a relationship with Shades. In the second season, Mariah prepares to go legitimate and retire from her family's criminal activities with help from her childhood friend Raymond "Piranha" Jones while attempting to reconnect with Tilda. However, Mariah faces several violent attacks from Bushmaster, one of Mama Mabel's sons who seeks revenge for his parents' murder by murdering her associates, stealing the Stokes' arsenal, and depleting her bank accounts. After Cage rescues Mariah from one of Bushmaster's attacks, she retaliates by killing Bushmaster's uncle and a plant sent to spy on her, along with several innocents. A disgusted Shades turns himself into the police and works with them to apprehend her while Tilda learns the truth of her mother's criminal activities and joins Bushmaster. Mariah is eventually arrested and poisoned by Tilda, though she bequeaths Cottonmouth's keyboard to Tilda and Harlem's Paradise to Cage to broker peace between Harlem's gangs before she dies.

References

External links
 Black Mariah at Comicvine
 Black Mariah at Marvel Wikia
 
 

Marvel Comics supervillains
Marvel Comics female supervillains
Fictional African-American people
Marvel Comics television characters
Fictional crime bosses
Comics characters introduced in 1973
Fictional American politicians
Fictional characters from New York City
Characters created by Steve Englehart
Characters created by George Tuska
Luke Cage